Maternal autoimmune bullous disease is a blistering skin condition that presents at birth.

See also 
 Accessory nail of the fifth toe
 List of cutaneous conditions

References 

Cutaneous congenital anomalies